Dino Galparoli (born 1 June 1957) is a retired Italian football defender.

References

1957 births
Living people
Italian footballers
A.C. Reggiana 1919 players
Brescia Calcio players
Udinese Calcio players
U.S. Alessandria Calcio 1912 players
A.C. Cuneo 1905 players
Association football defenders
Serie A players